Agny is a commune in the Pas-de-Calais department in northern France.

Geography
A farming village located 3 miles (5 km) southwest of Arras, at the D3 and D60 road junction.

History
World War I 1914–1918. War broke out in August 1914 and in September troops were massed on the territory. Agny quickly found itself on the front line. As it was also on a railway line, it was easy to approach the theatre of operations. 
In October 1914, violent fighting allowed the German army to advance.
A bloody battle took place on 25 September 1915. The French 135th Infantry Regiment lost 38 officers and 1162 men killed, wounded or missing.
Despite the fierce fighting during the conflict, the town hall, built in 1860, was not destroyed. 
The Second World War. When this conflict broke out, the invading Germans soon occupied the commune. Networks of resistance were quickly set in place. The mayor, Philibert Cleret carried out some particularly dangerous actions but was eventually captured. He was arrested, interned, and then deported. He died at Buchenwald on March 10, 1945.

Population

Sights
 The church of St.Laurent, rebuilt in the 20th century.

See also
Communes of the Pas-de-Calais department

International relations

Agny is twinned with Betley, United Kingdom.

References

Communes of Pas-de-Calais